Norwegian Geotechnical Institute (NGI)  is an independent international centre for research and consultancy in engineering-related geosciences, integrating geotechnical, geological and geophysical expertise.

NGI is a national centre for geotechnical research and development. The research and development is conducted within geotechnics and associated disciplines create results in the form of new expertise, new methods and new technology, with expertise within material properties, modelling and analysis, and instrumentation and monitoring. NGI's strength lies in the expertise of its personnel working in collaboration with clients and partners.

NGI is also the host of the International Centre for Geohazards (ICG), one of Norway's first Centres of Excellence (CoE). NGI's partners are NORSAR, the Norwegian Geological Survey (NGU), the University of Oslo (UiO) and the Norwegian University of Science and Technology (NTNU).

External links
Norwegian Geotechnical Institute
International Centre for Geohazards (ICG)

Earth science research institutes
Research institutes in Norway
Geotechnical engineering companies